is a Japanese conductor.

While still in school, Sado obtained a position in the Kansai Nikikai, a Japanese school of opera, where he had the opportunity to work with the New Japan Philharmonic and the Kyoto Symphony Orchestra, learning operatic repertoire. In 1987, he traveled to the United States to attend the Tanglewood Music Festival, where he studied with Seiji Ozawa. Later he won the Davidoff Special Prize for a competition in Schleswig-Holstein, Germany. He returned to Japan as an assistant to Ozawa and made his debut with the New Japan Philharmonic in Tokyo with a Haydn symphony series. He later studied with Charles Dutoit, Gennady Rozhdestvensky, and Leonard Bernstein, with whom he toured the Soviet Union and Germany.

Sado won first prize and became the third Japanese winner (after Seiji Ozawa in 1979 and Yoko Matsuo in 1982) at the 39th annual International Besançon Competition for Young Conductors in Besançon, France in 1989. In 1990, he became a regular participant in the Pacific Music Festival in Sapporo, Japan, along with Christoph Eschenbach and Michael Tilson Thomas. Sado also serves as artistic director and artistic advisor of the Hyogo Performing Arts Center and principal conductor of the Hyogo Performing Arts Center Orchestra which he helped establish in 2005.

Outside Japan, Sado was principal conductor of the Orchestre Lamoureux from 1993 to 2011.  He recorded with the Orchestre Lamoureux for such labels as Erato. In October 1995, Sado was named the winner of the first Leonard Bernstein Jerusalem International Music Competition. In 2011, he conducted Beethoven's 9th symphony, with 10,000 Japanese people, for the victims of the 2011 Japanese earthquake. In November 2013, the Tonkünstler Orchestra announced the appointment of Sado as its next principal conductor, effective with the 2015–2016 season, with an initial contract of 3 years.

References

External links
 Official website of Yutaka Sado
 Berlin Philharmonic Orchestra, Digital Concert Hall, interview with Yutaka Sado

1961 births
21st-century conductors (music)
Japanese conductors (music)
Japanese male conductors (music)
Kyoto City University of Arts alumni
Living people
Musicians from Kyoto
21st-century Japanese male musicians
Erato Records artists